Peter D. Karp is director of the Bioinformatics Research Group at  SRI International in Menlo Park, California. 
Karp leads the development of the BioCyc database collection (which includes the highly curated EcoCyc and MetaCyc databases).  BioCyc databases combine genome, metabolic pathway, and regulatory
information for thousands of organisms.

Education
Karp received his undergraduate degree from the University of Pennsylvania.  He received a Ph.D. degree in Computer Science from Stanford University.  His dissertation developed qualitative reasoning and machine learning techniques for hypothesis generation in molecular biology.  Karp was a postdoctoral fellow at the National Library of Medicine.

Honors and recognition

He was elected a fellow of the  International Society for Computational Biology (ISCB) in 2012 for outstanding contributions to the fields of computational biology and bioinformatics.  He is also a Fellow of the American Association for the Advancement of Science.

References

Living people
American bioinformaticians
SRI International people
Year of birth missing (living people)